The Canada Company was a private British land development company that was established to aid in the colonization of a large part of Upper Canada. It was incorporated by royal charter on August 19, 1826, under an act of the British parliament, which was given royal assent on June 27, 1825. It was originally formed to acquire and develop Upper Canada's undeveloped clergy reserves and Crown reserves, which the company bought in 1827 for £341,000 ($693,000) from the Province of Upper Canada.

Founded by John Galt, who became its first Superintendent, the company was successful in populating an area called the Huron Tract – an achievement later called "the most important single attempt at settlement in Canadian history".

It is unrelated to the modern-day Canadian charity of the same name, founded in 2006, which assists former Canadian military members and their spouses regain civilian employment after service in the Canadian Armed Forces.

Acquisition of lands

Mission

The Canada Company assisted emigrants by providing good ships, low fares, implements and tools, and inexpensive land. Scottish novelist  John Galt was the company's first Canadian superintendent. He first settled in York (Toronto, Ontario) but selected Guelph as the company's headquarters, and his home. The area was previously part of the Halton Block, 42,000 acres of former Crown land. Galt would later be considered as the founder of Guelph.

The company surveyed and subdivided the massive Huron Tract, built roads, mills, and schools and advertised lots for sale to buyers in Europe. the town of Goderich was laid out on the shores of Lake Huron to be the centre of the settlement of the Huron Tract. The company then assisted in the migration of new settlers, bringing them to the area by means of a steamboat, which the company also owned, on Lake Ontario.

John Galt was dismissed and recalled to Great Britain in 1829, for mismanagement, particularly incompetent bookkeeping. General mismanagement and corruption within the company, and its close alliance with the Tory elites, known as the Family Compact, were important contributing factors to the Upper Canada Rebellion in 1837.

In 1833, his colleague William "Tiger" Dunlop took over as Superintendent of the Company and continued Galt's work for a short time before resigning.

Company structure
Appointed Secretary of the Canada Company in 1824 John Galt helped to obtain a charter for the company on 19 Aug. 1826. On that date, the formal structure of the Canada Company was put into place by the company's Court of Directors. John Galt, as secretary, had the first order of business. Tabling an abstract of the charter, Galt declared the name to be "The Canada Company" with directors and secretary as served on the Provisional Committee and listed in the charter.

At the first meeting of the board, it was declared that four directors would rotate off the Company beginning in 1829.

Dissolution

When the Company sold its land to different purchasers, it reserved the mineral rights to itself. In 1919, the Company issued quit claims on such claims, vesting the mineral rights to the Crown. As a consequence, the Legislative Assembly of Ontario passed legislation in 1922 and 1923 authorizing the grant of such rights to landholders at a set price.

In 1928, a plaque was erected in Huron county, Pioneers of the Huron Tract 1828-1928, commemorating the work of the men who developed the Huron Tract and the families who lived there, starting in 1828.

It had become a land company in the process of liquidation. By 1950, only  remained in its possession, distributed amongst Lambton County, the United Counties of Leeds and Grenville and Lanark County.

In 1951, the remaining land was disposed of, and land that was unsold became Pinery Provincial Park.

The company voted to wind up its affairs on August 12, 1953, and was dissolved on December 18, 1953.

See also

 Huron Tract
 Family Compact
 William "Tiger" Dunlop, MP
 Robert Graham Dunlop, MP

Sources

References

Further reading

Chartered companies
English colonization of the Americas
Economic history of Canada
Political history of Ontario
Upper Canada
1825 establishments in Upper Canada
1953 disestablishments in Canada
Companies established in 1825
Companies disestablished in 1825
Trading companies established in the 19th century
Trading companies disestablished in the 19th century
Trading companies of Canada
History of Wellington County, Ontario